Keith Christopher Redmond (born October 25, 1972) is a Canadian former professional hockey player, who played with the Los Angeles Kings for the 1993-94 season.

Biography 
Keith Redmond played college hockey for Bowling Green University during the 1990-91 and 1991-92 hockey seasons. He also spent part of the 1991-92 season in the Ontario Hockey League (OHL) playing for the Belleville Bulls and the Detroit Ambassadors. In addition to his season in the NHL, he spent four seasons with the Phoenix Roadrunners of the International Hockey League. He was selected by the Kings in the 1991 NHL Entry Draft, being drafted number 79 overall in the fourth round.

References

External links
Keith Redmond's profile at hockeydb.com

1972 births
Living people
Belleville Bulls players
Bowling Green Falcons men's ice hockey players
Canadian ice hockey left wingers
Detroit Compuware Ambassadors players
Sportspeople from Richmond Hill, Ontario
Los Angeles Kings draft picks
Los Angeles Kings players
Nepean Raiders players
Phoenix Roadrunners (IHL) players
Ice hockey people from Ontario